Enrique Tucuna (born 6 August 1968) is an Uruguayan former basketball player.

References

1968 births
Living people
Basketball players at the 1991 Pan American Games
Pan American Games competitors for Uruguay
Uruguayan men's basketball players
Place of birth missing (living people)
20th-century Uruguayan people